The women's long jump event  at the 1987 European Athletics Indoor Championships was held on 21 February.

Results

References

Long jump at the European Athletics Indoor Championships
Long
Euro